Bay Street Emeryville is a large mixed-use development in Emeryville, California which currently has 65 stores, ten restaurants, a sixteen-screen movie theater, 230 room hotel, and 400 residential units with 1,000 residents.

Surroundings
It is near several hotels, an IKEA store, Pixar, and three other shopping centers: East Bay Bridge Shopping Center, Emeryville Marketplace, and Powell Street Plaza. The mall was built on the site of the Emeryville Shellmound.

Temescal Creek runs spring water and Emeryville urban through the property in an channelized open culvert with concrete lining to the confluence with the bay at the Crescent wetlands. It is adjacent to Interstates 80 and 580 in addition to the Oakland-San Francisco Bay Bridge and the MacArthur Maze. It is across from the Emeryville Crescent State Marine Reserve.

History
The mall has the only LEED certified West Elm that also provides some of its own solar energy, with a grass roof to provide habitat for insects, and substantial use of sky lights to reduce energy use.

The mall is built on an Ohlone Indian burial ground and shellmound and former toxic waste site. Since 2001 there has been a "don't buy anything day" hosted at the site by descendants of the Ohlones that believe the site has desecrated the resting place of their ancestors.

In 2010 the mall began to attract tourists to a  Christmas tree made out of 84 shopping carts. The unique tree created by artist Anthony Schmitt originated from Santa Monica, California, where it was displayed every winter season until 2014. New general management took over in 2017.

Stores

Bay Street features a mix of upscale and traditional mall retailers, with a two-level Barnes & Noble bookstore, flagship West Elm and Apple stores. Four Gap, Inc brands: Gap, Old Navy, Athleta, and separate men's and women's Banana Republic stores all closed in 2020 due to the COVID-19 pandemic.

California Pizza Kitchen, P.F. Chang's China Bistro, and Rubio's Coastal Grill restaurants, UNIQLO,  standalone H&M men's and women's stores, and an AMC Theatres cinema are also present.

Transportation access
The mall has public transport access by AC Transit local bus line 36 between the West Oakland BART station and the University of California, Berkeley, furthermore transbay commuter routes C, F, J to the San Francisco Transbay Terminal and Z reverse commute from San Francisco to Emeryville. the Emeryville Amtrak Station, and free Emery-go-Round shuttles on the Shellmound/Powell line to MacArthur BART station and other areas in the city. Parking, originally free, now costs US$2–10 depending on the length of stay. The fees have been controversial, as they have been consistently raised over the years.

References

External links

Shopping malls in the San Francisco Bay Area
Emeryville, California
Shopping malls established in 2002
Shopping malls in Alameda County, California
Hotels established in 2002
Tourist attractions in Alameda County, California
Mixed-use developments in California
Ohlone